Hugh Brown (born 6 November 1940) was a Scottish footballer who played for Kilmarnock and Dumbarton.

References

1940 births
Scottish footballers
Dumbarton F.C. players
Scottish Football League players
Living people
Kilmarnock F.C. players
Association football inside forwards
Place of birth missing (living people)